Gunabhadra (fl. ninth century CE) was a Digambara monk in India. He co-authored Mahapurana along with Jinasena.

His lineage started with Chandrasena who initiated Aryanandi. Aryanandi initiated Virasena and Jayasena. Virasena initiated six disciples who were Dasharayguru, Jinasena, Vinayasena, Shripal, Padmasena and Devasena. Dasharayguru and Jinasena initiated Gunabhadra who later initiated Lokasena. Vinayasena initiated Kumarasena who started the Kashtha Sangha.

References

Citations

Sources

External links

Digambara monks
Indian Jain writers
4th-century births